The 1948 Arizona gubernatorial election took place on November 2, 1948. Following the death of Governor Sidney Preston Osborn while in office, Dan Edward Garvey, who was serving as Secretary of State of Arizona was ascended to the position of governor, and thus ran for a full term. Facing a crowded primary field, Garvey emerged successful as the Democratic party's nominee.

Dan Edward Garvey was challenged by Republican Bruce Brockett in the general election, who had run in 1946 against Osborn, and had previously signaled a shift in voters becoming more Republican, outperforming their past electoral failures significantly. Despite this, Garvey was elected to a full term, and was sworn in on January 4, 1949.

Democratic primary

Candidates
 Dan Edward Garvey, incumbent Governor (ascended to Governor following the death of Sidney P. Osborn)
 Richard F. Harless, U.S. Congressman
 Jim Smith
 J. Melvin Goodson, state representative
 Thad M. Moore, Arizona State Tax Commission
 Marvin E. Smith, state senator
 Howard Sprouse, state senator

Results

Republican primary

Candidates
 Bruce Brockett, cattleman and Republican nominee for governor in 1946
 William R. Bourden, state legislator

Results

General election

References

1948
1948 United States gubernatorial elections
Gubernatorial
November 1948 events in the United States